Yves Allegro and Horia Tecău were the defending champions, however they chose to not compete this year.
Lucas Arnold Ker and Sebastián Prieto won this tournament, by defeating Johan Brunström and Jean-Julien Rojer 7–6(4), 2–6, [10–7] in the final.

Seeds

Draw

Draw

References
 Doubles Draw

San Marino CEPU Open - Doubles